Events in the year 1984 in Belgium.

Incumbents
 Monarch: Baudouin
 Prime Minister: Wilfried Martens

Events
 2 to 17 October – Communist Combatant Cells carry out a series of attacks against American and German companies, the Paul Hymans Institute, and the Ghent offices of the Flemish Christian Democrats
 15 December – Roger Vangheluwe appointed as Bishop of Bruges by Pope John Paul II.

Publications
 Biographie Nationale de Belgique, vol. 42
 Jean Stengers and Anne Van Neck, Histoire d'une grande peur: la masturbation (Brussels, Editions de l'Université de Bruxelles) 
 Jean-Émile Humblet, Jalons pour une histoire religieuse de la Wallonie (Brussels, Vie Ouvrière) 
 C. Vandenbroeke, Vlaamse koopkracht: Gisteren, vandaag en morgen (Leuven, Kritak) 
 Denis Whitaker, Tug of War: Allied Command and the story behind the Battle of the Scheldt (New York, Beaufort Books)

Births

Deaths

References

 
1980s in Belgium
20th century in Belgium
Events in Belgium
Deaths in Belgium